There are about 118 known moth species of Burundi. The moths (mostly nocturnal) and butterflies (mostly diurnal) together make up the taxonomic order Lepidoptera.

This is a list of moth species which have been recorded in Burundi.

Arctiidae
Amata alicia (Butler, 1876)
Apisa subargentea Joicey & Talbot, 1921
Asura gigantea Kühne, 2007
Asura mutabilis Kühne, 2007
Balacra compsa (Jordan, 1904)
Balacra rattrayi (Rothschild, 1910)
Balacra rubrostriata (Aurivillius, 1892)
Cragia adiastola (Kiriakoff, 1958)
Creatonotos leucanioides Holland, 1893
Metarctia flavicincta Aurivillius, 1900
Metarctia lateritia Herrich-Schäffer, 1855
Nyctemera itokina (Aurivillius, 1904)
Pseudothyretes kamitugensis (Dufrane, 1945)
Utetheisa pulchella (Linnaeus, 1758)

Crambidae
Diasemia lunalis Gaede, 1916
Orphanostigma excisa (Martin, 1956)
Psara cryptolepis (Martin, 1956)
Udea ferrugalis (Hübner, 1796)

Eupterotidae
Jana fletcheri Berger, 1980
Jana roseata Rothschild, 1917
Janomima dannfelti (Aurivillius, 1893)
Stenoglene obtusus (Walker, 1864)
Stenoglene roseus (Druce, 1886)

Geometridae
Cleora pavlitzkiae (D. S. Fletcher, 1958)
Cleora rostella D. S. Fletcher, 1967
Idiodes flexilinea (Warren, 1898)
Idiodes pectinata (Herbulot, 1966)
Pingasa distensaria (Walker, 1860)
Zamarada acosmeta Prout, 1921
Zamarada amicta Prout, 1915
Zamarada bathyscaphes Prout, 1912
Zamarada delta D. S. Fletcher, 1974
Zamarada gamma D. S. Fletcher, 1958
Zamarada glareosa Bastelberger, 1909
Zamarada metrioscaphes Prout, 1912
Zamarada plana Bastelberger, 1909
Zamarada prolata D. S. Fletcher, 1974
Zamarada seydeli D. S. Fletcher, 1974

Lasiocampidae
Braura elgonensis (Kruck, 1940)
Braura ligniclusa (Walker, 1865)
Eutricha morosa (Walker, 1865)
Metajana marshalli Aurivillius, 1909
Morongea lampara Zolotuhin & Prozorov, 2010
Odontocheilopteryx myxa Wallengren, 1860
Odontocheilopteryx phoneus Hering, 1928
Odontocheilopteryx scilla Gurkovich & Zolotuhin, 2009
Pachyna subfascia (Walker, 1855)
Pachytrina papyroides (Tams, 1936)
Pallastica meloui (Riel, 1909)
Pallastica pallens (Bethune-Baker, 1908)
Pallastica sericeofasciata (Aurivillius, 1921)
Stenophatna rothschildi (Tams, 1936)

Lymantriidae
Batella katanga (Collenette, 1938)
Cropera testacea Walker, 1855
Crorema fuscinotata (Hampson, 1910)
Dasychira lulua Collenette, 1937
Dasychira punctifera (Walker, 1857)
Eudasychira georgiana (Fawcett, 1900)
Eudasychira subeudela Dall'Asta, 1983
Euproctis bigutta Holland, 1893
Euproctis conizona Collenette, 1933
Euproctis molunduana Aurivillius, 1925
Euproctis pallida (Kirby, 1896)
Euproctis utilis Swinhoe, 1903
Hyaloperina nudiuscula Aurivillius, 1904
Jacksoniana striata (Collenette, 1937)
Lacipa jefferyi (Collenette, 1931)
Laelia bifascia Hampson, 1905
Laelia eutricha Collenette, 1931
Laelia extorta (Distant, 1897)
Laelia figlina Distant, 1899
Laelia fracta Schaus & Clements, 1893
Laelia gigantea Hampson, 1910
Laelia rogersi Bethune-Baker, 1913
Leucoma parva (Plötz, 1880)
Mylantria xanthospila (Plötz, 1880)
Neomardara africana (Holland, 1893)
Olapa tavetensis (Holland, 1892)
Orgyia hopkinsi Collenette, 1937
Otroeda hesperia (Cramer, 1779)
Porthesaroa lacipa Hering, 1926
Sphragista kitchingi (Bethune-Baker, 1909)
Tamsita ochthoeba (Hampson, 1920)

Metarbelidae
Mountelgonia urundiensis Lehmann, 2013

Noctuidae
Acontia secta Guenée, 1852
Acontia transfigurata Wallengren, 1856
Aegocera fervida (Walker, 1854)
Aegocera obliqua Mabille, 1893
Aegocera rectilinea Boisduval, 1836
Crameria amabilis (Drury, 1773)
Feliniopsis laportei Hacker & Fibiger, 2007
Feliniopsis satellitis (Berio, 1974)
Heraclia geryon (Fabricius, 1781)
Heraclia monslunensis (Hampson, 1901)
Heraclia superba (Butler, 1875)
Metagarista triphaenoides Walker, 1854
Mitrophrys menete (Cramer, 1775)
Tuertella rema (Druce, 1910)

Nolidae
Blenina chrysochlora (Walker, 1865)

Notodontidae
Antheua gallans (Karsch, 1895)
Antheua grisea (Gaede, 1928)
Atrasana vittata Kiriakoff, 1969
Stenostaura dorsalis Kiriakoff, 1969
Thaumetopoea apologetica Strand, 1909

Pterophoridae
Pterophorus candidalis (Walker, 1864)

Saturniidae
Nudaurelia anthinoides Rougeot, 1978
Pselaphelia vandenberghei Bouyer, 1992
Tagoropsis hecqui Bouyer, 1989
Tagoropsis rougeoti D. S. Fletcher, 1952
Urota centralis Bouyer, 2008

Tineidae
Ceratophaga vastellus (Zeller, 1852)
Cimitra fetialis (Meyrick, 1917)
Perissomastix pantsa Gozmány, 1967

References

External links 

Burundi
Burundi
Moths